Antispila praecincta is a moth of the family Heliozelidae. It was described by Edward Meyrick in 1921. It is found in Brazil.

References 

Moths described in 1921
Heliozelidae